"Standing Still" is a song written by British musician Jamie Cullum and performed by German singer Roman Lob.   It was the German entry at the Eurovision Song Contest 2012 in Baku finishing in 8th place. The song was released digitally in Germany on 16 February 2012 as a track on Lob's début studio album Changes. The single was certified gold by the Bundesverband Musikindustrie for domestic shipments exceeding 150,000.

Track listing

Charts

Year-end charts

Release history

References

Eurovision songs of 2012
Eurovision songs of Germany
Roman Lob songs
English-language German songs
Songs written by Steve Robson
Songs written by Wayne Hector
2011 songs
Universal Music Group singles
2012 debut singles